Cando may refer to:

 Cando, North Dakota
 Cando, Saskatchewan
 Cando, Spain
 Cando (river), in San Marino
 CANDO, community project
 NEO CANDO
 Cando Rail & Terminals